Cyclophora myrtaria, the waxmyrtle wave moth, is a moth in the  family Geometridae. It is found in North America, where it is found along the Atlantic ocean plane.

The wingspan is 24–27 mm.

The larvae feed on Myrtaceae species.

References

Moths described in 1857
myrtaria
Moths of North America